The football tournament at the 2001 East Asian Games was held on 19 May 2001 to 27 May 2001. The tournament is played by U-23 men's national teams.

Venues
 Osaka Expo '70 Stadium
 Nagai Stadium
 Tsurumi-Ryokuchi Stadium

Group stage

Group A

Group B

Knockout stage

Semi-finals

Third place match

Final

Medalists

Australia parted as guest, so Korea Republic and Kazakhstan were awarded 2nd and 3rd respectively.

External links
 East Asian Games 2001 - rsssf.com

2001 in Asian football
2001 in Japanese football
2001 in Kazakhstani football
2001 in Australian soccer
2001 in South Korean football
2001
Football
2001
2001 in Macau football